Xerula is a genus of gilled mushrooms in the family Physalacriaceae.

Species

References
Footnotes

Citations

External links
 

Physalacriaceae
Taxa named by René Maire
Agaricales genera